The 2000 Davis Cup World Group Qualifying Round was held from 14 to 23 July. They were the main play-offs of the 2000 Davis Cup. The winners of the playoffs advanced to the 2001 Davis Cup World Group, and the losers were relegated to their respective Zonal Regions I.

Teams
Bold indicates team had qualified for the 2001 Davis Cup World Group.

From World Group

 
 
 
 
 
 
 
 

 From Americas Group I

 
 

 From Asia/Oceania Group I

 
 

 From Europe/Africa Group I

Results summary
Date: 14–23 July

The eight losing teams in the World Group first round ties and eight winners of the Zonal Group I final round ties competed in the World Group Qualifying Round for spots in the 2001 World Group.

Qualifying results

France vs. Austria

Great Britain vs. Ecuador

Italy vs. Belgium

Uzbekistan vs. Netherlands

Sweden vs. India

Switzerland vs. Belarus

Zimbabwe vs. Romania

Notes

References

External links
Davis Cup official website

World Group Qualifying Round